The baseball competition at the 2018 Central American and Caribbean Games was held at the Edgar Rentería Baseball Stadium in Barranquilla, Colombia from 20 to 29 July 2018.

Medal summary

Standings

Results

References

External links
2018 Central American and Caribbean Games – Baseball

2018 Central American and Caribbean Games events
Central American and Caribbean Games
2018
Qualification tournaments for the 2019 Pan American Games
Central American and Caribbean Games